Batizovce is a village and municipality in Poprad District in the Prešov Region of northern Slovakia. Village dominants are evangelical and Roman Catholic churches in classic and baroque styles.

Geography
The municipality lies at an altitude of 756 metres and covers an area of 14.348 km². It has a population of about 2125 people.

History
In historical records the village was first mentioned in 1264. Locals had been engaged in agriculture, forestry, pottery, weaving and charcoal production. In 1934 they began to be employed in Svit industrial facilities.

Genealogical resources

The records for genealogical research are available at the state archive "Statny Archiv in Levoca, Slovakia"

 Roman Catholic church records (births/marriages/deaths): 1844-1899 (parish A)
 Lutheran church records (births/marriages/deaths): 1710-1895 (parish A)

See also
 List of municipalities and towns in Slovakia

External links
https://web.archive.org/web/20160308230623/http://batizovce.e-obce.sk/
Surnames of living people in Batizovce

Villages and municipalities in Poprad District